Choreutis vinosa is a moth in the family Choreutidae. It was described by Alexey Diakonoff in 1978. It is found in Japan and the Russian Far East (Irkutsk, Amur, Ussuri).

Subspecies
Choreutis vinosa vinosa (Russia)
Choreutis vinosa discolor (Diakonoff & Arita, 1979) (Japan)

References

Natural History Museum Lepidoptera generic names catalog

Choreutis
Moths described in 1978